The 2018 Townsville Blackhawks season was the fourth in the club's history. Coached by Kristian Woolf and captained by Andrew Niemoeller, they competed in the Intrust Super Cup. The club finished the regular season in 3rd position and qualified for the finals but were eliminated in the first week by the Ipswich Jets.

Season summary

Milestones
 Round 1: Joe Boyce, Michael Carroll, Zach Dockar-Clay, Kalifa Faifai Loa, Jaelen Feeney, Krys Freeman, Rod Griffin, Shaun Hudson and Jake Marketo made their debuts for the club.
 Round 1: Michael Carroll, Zach Dockar-Clay, Kalifa Faifai Loa, Jaelen Feeney, Krys Freeman and Jake Marketo scored their first tries for the club.
 Round 2: Francis Molo scored his first try for the club.
 Round 3: Brent Woolf made his debut for the club.
 Round 4: Andrew Davey made his debut for the club.
 Round 5: Cade Maloney made his debut for the club.
 Round 5: Brent Woolf scored his first try for the club.
 Round 6: Levi Dodd made his debut for the club.
 Round 7: Levi Dodd scored his first try for the club.
 Round 8: Shaun Hudson and Cade Maloney scored their first tries for the club.
 Round 13: Sam Martin-Savage made his debut for the club.
 Round 16: Justin O'Neill made his debut for the club.
 Round 16: Rod Griffin scored his first try for the club.
 Round 19: Andrew Davey scored his first try for the club.
 Round 24: Bacho Salam made his debut for the club.
 Round 24: Bacho Salam scored his first try for the club.

2018 squad

Squad movement

Gains

Losses

Fixtures

Pre-season

Regular season

Finals

Statistics

Honours

Club
Player of the Year: Kalifa Faifai Loa
Players' Player: Temone Power
Back of the Year: Jaelen Feeney
Forward of the Year: Jake Marketo
Under 20 Player of the Year: Sam Martin-Savage
Under 18 Player of the Year: Isaac Locke

League
Winger of the Year: Kalifa Faifai Loa

References

2018 in Australian rugby league
2018 in rugby league by club
Townsville Blackhawks